Vera Lapko was the defending champion, but chose not to participate.

Anna Kalinskaya won the title, defeating Ana Bogdan in the final, 6–3, 6–4.

Seeds

Draw

Finals

Top half

Bottom half

References

Main Draw

Engie Open Saint-Gaudens Occitanie - Singles